The Embassy of Russia in London is the diplomatic mission of Russia in the United Kingdom. The main building and Consular section is located at 5 and 6-7 Kensington Palace Gardens at the junction with Bayswater Road; the Ambassador's Residence is located in a separate building at 13 Kensington Palace Gardens (Harrington House). Russia also maintains a Defence Attaché's Office at 44 Millfield Lane, Highgate, and an Office of the Trade Representative at 33 Highgate West Hill, Highgate.

History
The embassy of the Russian Empire was located at Chesham Place, Belgravia; this then functioned as the Embassy of the new Soviet Union from 1924 to 1927. Diplomatic relations were suspended during the period 1927–1929, and following their resumption the Soviet government moved to the various buildings on Kensington Palace Gardens.

Following the dissolution of the USSR, the Russian Federation inherited the former Soviet properties in the UK. But this was not recognized by Ukraine and in 1999 it initiated litigation, which like in case with most other former Soviet embassies around the world left this situation unresolved. Although previously the Russian Federation was able to register its property rights, it since then lost the rights to sell or rent it out. Due to Russian aggression against Ukraine, British government is reviewing possibility of seizing it.

Protests
The embassy has seen several protests over the years:
 2008 – the Cluster Munition Coalition and Landmine Action protested against Russia's alleged use of cluster bombs in the 2008 South Ossetia War between Russia and Georgia 
 2008 – Pro-Georgian protesters, opposed to Russia's role in the recent South Ossetia War, gathered outside the embassy
 2011 – Peter Tatchell and supporters protested about gay rights in Russia
 2012 – a protest was held by people opposed to the jailing of the punk band Pussy Riot
 2012 – opponents of the Bashar al-Assad regime in Syria (which is strongly supported by Russia) protested outside the embassy, allegedly damaging it 
 2013 – a large protest, attended by actor Jude Law and musician Damon Albarn, took place outside the embassy following the arrest of several Greenpeace activists in the Pechora Sea
 2013 – a protest occurred seeking to free the journalist Kieron Bryan and the Greenpeace activists
 12 April 2017 – a protest attended by hundreds was held to condemn the alleged establishment of prison camps for gay men in Chechnya

During the 2022 Russian invasion of Ukraine, it was alleged that Russian planes bombed a children's hospital in Mariupol, Ukraine.  Tweets from the Embassy of Russia about this were deleted by Twitter because the tweets were in violation of the Twitter Rules, specifically the 'Hateful Conduct and Abusive Behavior' policies related to the denial of violent events.

Gallery

See also 
 List of ambassadors of Russia to the United Kingdom

References

External links
Official site

Russia
London
Russia–United Kingdom relations
Buildings and structures in the Royal Borough of Kensington and Chelsea
Soviet Union–United Kingdom relations
Holland Park